Jesús Castillo Ugarte (born 16 May 1988) is a former defender who last played for the Celaya on loan from Monarcas Morelia, in the Ascenso MX.

External links
 

1988 births
Living people
People from Huetamo
Footballers from Michoacán
Mexican footballers
Association football defenders
Atlético Morelia players
C.F. Mérida footballers
Toros Neza footballers
Chiapas F.C. footballers
Atlético San Luis footballers
C.D. Veracruz footballers
Club Celaya footballers
Liga MX players